This is a list of all the awards given by the Badminton World Federation (BWF) World Tour to players and others of particular distinction during a given season.

Player of the Year 
From 1998 to 2007, this award was named Eddy Choong Player of the Year.

Para-player of the Year 
This award was first presented in 2015.

Pair of the Year

Eddy Choong Most Promising Player of the Year 
This award was created in 2008 following the decision by the BWF to split the "Eddy Choong Player of the Year" award into two different awards for male and female players respectively.

Most Improved Player of the Year

Best-Dressed 
This award is given to the best-dressed player at the Players' Gala held prior to the season-ending BWF World Tour Finals and its predecessor, the BWF Super Series Finals.

References 

Badminton records and statistics